Taherabad Rural District is in Bumehen District of Pardis County, Tehran province, Iran. At the National Censuses of 2006 and 2011, its constituent parts were in the Central District of Tehran County. At the most recent census of 2016, its villages were in Bumehen District of the newly formed Pardis County.

After the census, Karasht Rural District and the city of Pardis separated from Bumehen District to establish the Central District of Pardis County, with two rural districts and the city of Pardis as its capital. At the same time, Taherabad Rural District was formed after separating from Gol Khandan Rural District, with Taherabad as its capital.

References 

Pardis County

Rural Districts of Tehran Province

Populated places in Tehran Province

Populated places in Pardis County

fa:دهستان طاهرآباد